Patrick Rimbert (20 July 1944) is a French politician.
He is a member of the Socialist Party. He served as Mayor of Nantes from 2012 to 2014. He was deputy of the 1st constituency of Loire-Atlantique from 1997 to 2002. He was elected president of the Nantes region planning agency on January 14, 2015. He was general councilor of Loire-Atlantique from 1992 to 2001.

Biography
Patrick Rimbert was born in Blain, France on 1944. He becomes an economics professor. Patrick Rimbert then succeeds him as interim head of the municipality on June 21, then is elected mayor of Nantes by the municipal council on June 29.

References 

1944 births
Living people
People from Loire-Atlantique
Socialist Party (France) politicians
20th-century French politicians
21st-century French politicians
Mayors of Nantes